Andawala is a village in Sri Lanka. It is located within Central Province. 
It is also one of a remote village in Central Province with the beauty of nature. There are 3 roads to access Andawala by a vehicle. First is via Matale, Madawala Uplatha and others are via Naula, Ambana or Opalgala.
Many villagers are farmers and few are working as government officers. There is a trekking to Riverston via Andawala. Therefore, many visitors come for adventure travel.

There are two Buddhist temples in the village, and one was built in 1800s. Approximately, 400 families live there.

See also
List of towns in Central Province, Sri Lanka

External links

Map of Andawala

Populated places in Central Province, Sri Lanka